Thibaut Amani Danho (born 15 January 1994) is an Ivorian competitive swimmer. He competed at the 2016 Summer Olympics in Rio de Janeiro, in the men's 100 metre freestyle.

References

External links

1994 births
Living people
Ivorian male freestyle swimmers
Olympic swimmers of Ivory Coast
Swimmers at the 2016 Summer Olympics
Swimmers at the 2015 African Games
African Games competitors for Ivory Coast